Alan Waddle (born 9 June 1954) is an English former footballer who played as a striker. Waddle began his career with Halifax Town, signing professional forms in October 1971. He made 22 League appearances and scored the crucial goal in the last match of the 1972–73 season at Walsall enabling Halifax Town to avoid relegation from the old Third Division. In June 1973 Waddle was signed by Liverpool manager Bill Shankly and netted his only goal for the Reds in a 1–0 win over rivals Everton in December 1973. Waddle made 22 appearances for the club but he lost his place in 1975, and only played one game in his remaining two years, although he did play in the home leg of the team's victory over FC Zürich in the 1977 European Cup semi-final, and made it onto the bench for the 1977 European Cup Final, before leaving that summer. He spent a year at Leicester City before moving on to Swansea City, where he had his most productive spell, working under manager John Toshack, the player he had understudied at Liverpool. In December 1980 Waddle joined Newport County for a fee of £80,000, a club record for Newport. He went on to have a much-travelled career, which included two returns to Swansea (one as commercial operations manager), and spells in Finland, Hong Kong and Qatar. He is a cousin of Chris Waddle, the former Newcastle United, Tottenham Hotspur and England midfielder.

Footnotes

External links
Liverpool FC profile
Profile at LFCHistory.net

1954 births
Living people
Sportspeople from Wallsend
Footballers from Tyne and Wear
English footballers
Association football forwards
Wallsend Boys Club players
Halifax Town A.F.C. players
Liverpool F.C. players
Leicester City F.C. players
Swansea City A.F.C. players
Newport County A.F.C. players
Gloucester City A.F.C. players
Mansfield Town F.C. players
Happy Valley AA players
Hartlepool United F.C. players
Peterborough United F.C. players
Palloiluseura Apollo players
Barry Town United F.C. players
Al-Wakrah SC players
Llanelli Town A.F.C. players
Port Talbot Town F.C. players
Maesteg Park A.F.C. players
Bridgend Town A.F.C. players
English Football League players
Hong Kong First Division League players
Cymru Premier players
English expatriate footballers
Expatriate footballers in Hong Kong
Expatriate footballers in Finland
Expatriate footballers in Qatar
British expatriates in Finland
Qatar Stars League players
English expatriate sportspeople in Hong Kong
UEFA Champions League winning players